Blue Hills Reservation is a  state park in Norfolk County, Massachusetts in the United States. Managed by the Massachusetts Department of Conservation and Recreation, it covers parts of Milton, Quincy, Braintree, Canton, Randolph, and Dedham. Located approximately ten miles south of downtown Boston, the reservation is one of the largest parcels of undeveloped conservation land within the Greater Boston metropolitan area. The park's varied terrain and scenic views make it a popular destination for hikers from the Boston area.

History
European colonizers sailing the coastline noticed the bluish hue of the mountains, which is caused by the presence of riebeckite, which gave area its modern name. The name of the state of Massachusetts derives from the Massachusett Indian tribe's name of the hill: massa-adchu-es-et. In 1893, the Metropolitan Parks Commission purchased the lands of Blue Hills Reservation as one of the state's first areas dedicated to public recreation.

The practice of First Day Hikes to mark New Year's Day with an outdoor activity began in 1992 at Blue Hills Reservation.  By the 2010s, the idea had spread and such hikes were taking place in state parks nationwide.

Flora and fauna
The ecology of the Blue Hills is diverse and includes marshes, swamps, upland and bottomland forests, meadows, and an Atlantic white cedar bog.  A number of endangered species in Massachusetts, such as the timber rattlesnake and copperhead snake, reside in the reservation. Other flora and fauna include dogwood, lady's slipper, white-tailed deer, coyotes, wild turkey, red fox, and turkey vultures.

Climate 
The reservation experiences a humid continental climate (Köppen: Dfb), typical of most of New England. Summers are short but very warm with mild nights. Winters are short, very snowy, and very cloudy. Precipitation is heavy and very consistent year round.

Points of interest

Observatory
The highest point within the reservation, Great Blue Hill in Milton, is the site of the historic Blue Hill Meteorological Observatory. The observatory was founded in 1885 and is the oldest continuous weather recording station in the United States. Its tower offers views of Boston and the surrounding area. The tower and observatory are among numerous reservation features listed on the National Register of Historic Places.

Features listed on the National Register of Historic Places

Blue Hills Trailside Museum

The Blue Hills Trailside Museum, which is operated by the Massachusetts Audubon Society, offers indoor and outdoor animal exhibits. The museum opened in 1959, and was initially operated by the Museum of Science.  Mass Audubon began operating the museum in 1974.

Houghton's Pond Recreation Area

Houghton's Pond is located within Blue Hills Reservation.

Activities and amenities

Blue Hills Reservation is primarily used for hiking and mountain biking. It is also used for snowshoeing, downhill skiing, and cross country skiing during winter, and rock climbing (in certain areas) and horseback riding during permissible months. Between approximately December and March, Great Blue Hill offers a ski area. Houghton's Pond and nearby Ponkapoag Pond are popular swimming and recreation areas during the summer. Other recreational opportunities include non-motorized boating, camping, fishing, picnicking, playing fields, ice skating, interpretive programs, and a children's playground is accessible from the Hillside St entrance to Houghton's Pond.

References

External links

Blue Hills Reservation Department of Conservation and Recreation
Brochure and trail map
Friends of the Blue Hills
Blue Hill Observatory HazeCam Current panoramic photo from observatory
Online (mobile compatible) trail map
Civilian Conservation Corps (CCC)

Hills of Massachusetts
Landforms of Norfolk County, Massachusetts
Massachusetts Audubon Society
Massachusetts natural resources
Museums in Norfolk County, Massachusetts
Nature centers in Massachusetts
Natural history museums in Massachusetts
Geography of Braintree, Massachusetts
Parks in Norfolk County, Massachusetts
Religious places of the indigenous peoples of North America
Protected areas established in 1893
State parks of Massachusetts
1893 establishments in Massachusetts